The final session of the revolutionary Annapolis Convention in 1776 served as Maryland's first constitutional convention. They drafted a declaration of rights and a constitution for the state. This list of delegates reports the men who made up the convention, and the counties or towns they represented. Delegates were the following individuals.

Notes

References  

Maryland in the American Revolution
Maryland
Maryland
Convention